Basianshan National Forest Recreation Area is located in Bo'ai Village, Heping District, Taichung, Taiwan.

History
It was one of the main logging center alongside Mount Ali and Mount Taiping during the Japanese rule. In the mid 1970s, the area was designated as national forest recreation area. The forest suffered heavy damaged in the aftermath of Jiji earthquake in 1999 and Typhoon Toraji and Typhoon Nari in 2001.

Geology
The recreation area is located at an altitude of 750–2,366 meters above sea level and spans over an area of 24 km2. The highest point of the forest area is central Mount Basian. The mean annual temperature of the forest is 18°C. The forest features various streams and rivers.

See also
 Geography of Taiwan

References

Geography of Taichung
National forest recreation areas in Taiwan
Tourist attractions in Taichung